Peter Paliatka (born 1952 in Handlová, Slovakia) is Slovak designer, sculptor and university pedagogue. His works include designs in serial production (transportation, industrial and product design), interior design and sculptural realizations in architecture.

Biography
After high school where he studied Spišská Nová Ves (Furniture construction and interior) he studied "Tvarovanie výrobkov spotrebného priemyslu" at Vaclav Kautman's studio at AFAD Bratislava from 1972 - 78. After graduation and until 1993, he worked as a pedagogue at AFAD in Bratislava, first as an assistant of Vaclav Kautman, later Tibor Schotter (1980–84). In 1983 he spent one year on a study exchange in Italy. Since 1990, he was leading AFAD's Institute of Design. 1993 was the year of his successful habituation as a university lecturer.

In 1995, Peter Paliatka co-founded SSUŠ - Private Secondary Art School in Bratislava, where he was active as a director and pedagogue until 1998.

Since 2000, he has been leading his studio at the Institute of Industrial Design at the Faculty of Architecture of the Slovak University of Technology in Bratislava, as the head of the department.

Works and awards 
 Hydraulic rotary loader Detvan Hon 200, produced by PPS Group, a. s., Detva, co-authors Peter Chlpek, Peter Varga (Honor Prize, Slovak National Design Prize 2009)
 FUTURA, set of armatures for Slovak manufacturer of armatures in Myjava (Honor Prize, Slovak National Design Prize 1997)
 children playgrounds for Vrbové and Bratislava
 mid-tonnage lorry, BAZ Bratislava, 1985

Projects 
 Project Eating with Hi-macs article on designby.sk
 Project OMS Lightning article on zahorak.sk

Exhibitions 
 Umenie v meste, Galéria J. Klollára, Banská Štiavnica, Jún 2010
 Metal Inspirations 2007, STM, Kosice, August 2007 www.usske.sk

References

External links 
 Interview with P.Paliatka in INTERIER EXTERIER, 07/2011 interiermagazin.sk
 Article by Peter Paliatka: "Symbióza ako východisko" stavebni-technika.cz
 website of the  Institute of Design at Faculty of Architecture in Bratislava
 website of Academy of Fine Arts and Design in Bratislava
 website of Private Secondary Art School in Bratislava

Slovak sculptors
Slovak educators
Living people
1952 births
Academic staff of the Slovak University of Technology in Bratislava
People from Handlová